Kondaan Koduthaan is a 2012 Indian Tamil-language drama film directed by G. Rajendran and starring Kathirkaman and Advaitha.

Cast 
Kathirkaman as Raasu
Advaitha as Sevandhi
Ilavarasu as Chellaiya
Meera Krishnan as Balamani
Ganja Karuppu as Pachamuthu
L. Raja as Ganesan
Raj Kapoor as Mayandi
Manobala as Mayandi's assistant
Sulakshana
Sini as Poonkodi

Production 
Kadirkaman, who played the lead in Veluthu Kattu (2010), stars in this film. Advaitha, the lead actress, has played similar roles in Azhagarsamiyin Kuthirai (2011) and Sagakkal (2011). The film was shot in Kallur in twenty-five days. G. Rajendran, in addition to directing and writing the film, also worked as the cinematographer. The film is about two families who married between the families across four generations and how the recent generation tries to goes against the norm.

Soundtrack 
The songs are composed by Deva. Deva and Rajendran had previously worked together for the film Viralukketha Veekkam (1999).

Release and reception 
The film released on 2 March along with Aravaan. The Times of India gave the film a rating of two-and-a-half out of five stars and noted that "A good watch if you are in the mood for a family drama high on emotion". The Hindu wrote that "Content wise, KK makes a giant leap backwards in time. Would have worked well five decades ago!". Maalai Malar praised the family aspect of the film while criticising the quality of some scenes.

References 

Indian family films
Indian drama films
2012 directorial debut films
2012 films
Films scored by Deva (composer)
2010s Tamil-language films
2012 drama films